Lake Cherokee is an unincorporated community and census-designated place (CDP) in Gregg and Rusk counties, Texas, United States. Its population was 2,980 as of the 2020 census. Lake Cherokee is located 12 miles Southeast of Gregg and Northeastern Rusk counties on Cherokee Bayou. The lake is owned by the Cherokee Water Company to supply water for municipal, industrial, and recreational purposes. It has a capacity of 68,700 acre-feet. The lake impounds Cherokee Bayou. The top of the dam is at the elevation is 295 feet above the average sea level, but it has a max design of 291 feet above the average sea level. Lake Cherokee is located 12 miles Southeast of Gregg and Northeastern Rusk counties on Cherokee Bayou. The lake is owned by the Cherokee Water Company to supply water for municipal, industrial, and recreational purposes.

Geography
The community consists of housing development that surrounds Lake Cherokee, a reservoir on Cherokee Bayou, an east-flowing tributary of the Sabine River. Texas State Highway 149 forms the northern border of the CDP; the highway leads northwest  to Longview and southeast  to Carthage.

About three-quarters of the area of the CDP is within Rusk County, with the remainder in Gregg County. The county line follows the center of the lake for the lower half of its reach. The upstream half of the lake is entirely within Rusk County.

Demographics 

As of the 2020 United States census, there were 2,980 people, 1,424 households, and 1,065 families residing in the CDP.

Terrestrial ecosystem 
Fauna:

Fish
 Largemouth Bass
 Channel Catfish
 Blue Catfish
 White Crappie
 Bluegill

Recreation 
Lake Cherokee has recreational areas that include Arrowhead Park. Arrowhead Park has activites like boating, library, a clubhouse, and a lake activity center.

References

Census-designated places in Gregg County, Texas
Census-designated places in Rusk County, Texas
Census-designated places in Texas
Unincorporated communities in Gregg County, Texas
Unincorporated communities in Rusk County, Texas
Unincorporated communities in Texas